Parker Bluff is a bold, rounded bluff at the south end of the California Plateau, overlooking Van Reeth Glacier about 5 nautical miles (9 km) east of Mount Blackburn, in the Queen Maud Mountains. Mapped by United States Geological Survey (USGS) from surveys and U.S. Navy air photos, 1960–64. Named by Advisory Committee on Antarctic Names (US-ACAN) for John J. Parker, photographer with U.S. Navy Squadron VX-6 on Operation Deep Freeze 1966 and 1967.

References 

Cliffs of Marie Byrd Land